Bishamon is the Japanese name for Vaiśravaṇa, a Buddhist deity.

Bishamon or Bishamonten may also refer to:

Fiction
 Bishamon (Darkstalkers), a living suit of samurai armor in Darkstalkers fighting video games
 Bishamon, an ultimate weapon used by Uesugi Kenshin in the Samurai Warriors Xtreme Legends PlayStation 2 video game
 Bishamonten, a character in the Noragami anime and manga

Other
 Bishamon Station, a railway station in Aomori, Japan
 Bishamon, a tag team wrestling affiliate in the Chaos wrestling stable
 Lake Bishamon, one of the Goshiki-numa

See also
 Camponotus bishamon, a species of carpenter ant
 Ponera bishamon, a species of ant in the genera Ponera

ja:毘沙門天